Glaxnimate is a free and open-source, cross-platform, 2D vector animation software. 

It has been integrated into Shotcut and Kdenlive to add vector capabilities to video editors.

Supported Formats 

Glaxnimate saves animations using a custom JSON-based format, but it also supports loading and saving animated SVG and Lottie.

It can also render to video using FFmpeg, WebP, and GIF.

It can import and render to a variety of raster image formats.

Features

Graphics 

 Gradients
 Bézier curves
 Image tracing
 Masking
 Text

Animation 

 Tweening
 Pecompositions
 Animation along path

References

External links 

 

Cross-platform free software
Free 2D animation software
Free graphics software
Free software programmed in C++
Free vector graphics editors
Motion graphics software for Linux
Vector graphics editors for Linux
2D animation software
Animation software